Cape Burks is a prominent rock cape, the northwestern seaward extension of McDonald Heights, marking the east side of the entrance of Hull Bay on the coast of Marie Byrd Land.  The cape was sighted and mapped from the USS Glacier, January  31, 1962, and was named for Lieutenant Commander Ernest Burks, U.S. Navy, senior helicopter pilot on the Glacier and the first person to set  foot on the cape.

Russkaya Station was established on Cape Burks by the Soviet Union in 1980.

Further reading 
 Ute Christina Herzfeld, Atlas of Antarctica: Topographic Maps from Geostatistical Analysis of Satellite Radar Altimeter Data, P 194
 David G. Ainley, The Ad lie Penguin: Bellwether of Climate Change, P 78
 D.A. Tkacheva, E.V. Mikhalsky, N.M. Sushchevskaya, E.L. Kunakkuzin, S.G. Skublov, S.A. Sergeev,  Mountain Age and Geochemistry of the Cape Burks Gabbroids (Russkaya Station Area, West Antarctica),  Geokhimiya, 2018, No. 7, 2018, DOI: 10.1134/S001670291807011X
 E. V. Abakumov, Particle Size Distribution in Soils of West Antarctica,  ISSN 1064-2293, Eurasian Soil Science, 2010, Vol. 43, No. 3, pp. 297–304, DOI: 10.1134/S1064229310030075, See P. 298

References
 

Headlands of Marie Byrd Land